Hicks is an unincorporated community in White River Township, Washington County, Arkansas, United States. It is located along Highway 74 south of Elkins.

References

Unincorporated communities in Washington County, Arkansas
Unincorporated communities in Arkansas